Forward Operating Base Shank (also known as Rocket City) is a former Forward operating base of the U.S. military, located in Logar Province of eastern Afghanistan, about 12 km south-east of the city of Baraki Barak.  During Operation Enduring freedom, FOB Shank was one of the most heavily rocketed forward operating bases in Afghanistan.  In 2014, the base was turned over to Afghan National Army, who established Camp Maiwand at the northern end of the FOB.  American forces later returned and reoccupied the southern portion of the FOB, under the name Camp Dahlke.

History
In 2008, International Security Assistance Force (ISAF) used the base to train the Afghan National Police (ANP).  The Police Academy, led by a U.S. Police Mentoring Training team, cooperated daily with the Czech Provincial Reconstruction Team Logar, composed of 200 Czech Soldiers and about 10 civilians.

These efforts were focused on training the Afghanistan National Auxiliary Police to become members of the ANP.

As of 8 July 2008, Czech and Afghan instructors were teaching the fourth group of cadets at the Academy. Each group attended a three-week cycle which included first-aid treatment, tactics, patrolling, weapons training, vehicle-check-point procedures and many other police-related subjects. The practical part of the training also included scenarios where cadets were ambushed by simulated oppositional forces.

During 2014 the base was downsized partly by 252 Engineer Company, 133rd Engineer Battalion and was turned over to the ANA.  The ANA utilized the northern portion of the base only, which they renamed Camp Maiwand.

The last few convoys containing equipment from FOB Shank back to Bagram Airbase were completed during October 2014 by the 730th Transportation Company, 419th Combat Sustainment Support Battalion, 4th Resolute Support Sustainment Brigade.

Following the shutdown of FOB Shank, a new American base was established at the southern end of the perimeter, called FOB Dahlke or Camp Dahlke.  Camp Dahlke was expanded in 2018 to support the deployment of the 1st Security Force Assistance Brigade. Camp Dahlke had facilities to house 800 soldiers.

Deployed units

Aviation
October 2008-October 2009
101st Airborne
October 2009–October 2010
3rd Infantry Division 4-3 AVN Battalion "BRAWLER" under Lt. Col Ault 
December 2008-December 2009
710BSB 3RD IBCT 10th MTN
2010–2010 10th Mountain
 April 2011
 10th Combat Aviation Brigade
 Company F, 2nd Battalion (Aviation Support)
 August 2011–August 2012
 82nd Combat Aviation Brigade (TF Corsair)
 Unknown Company, 3rd Battalion
 All Companies, 2nd Battalion, 82nd Aviation Regiment (UH-60M)
 Company B, 3rd Battalion, 82nd Aviation Regiment (CH-47F)
 Company B, 2nd Battalion, 135th Aviation Regiment (CH-47)
 Company F, 1st Attack Battalion, 1st Air Combat Brigade, 227th Aviation Regiment, 1st Cavalry Division (Gray Eagle) (3/2012 - 03/2013) – first unit to operate Gray Eagle at Shank. This company was deployed as a standalone company and attached to the 82nd Airborne Division upon arrival to Shank. After TF Corsair left, F 227 was attached to the incoming unit until its tour of duty was completed.
 Elements of 122nd Aviation Support Battalion
 June – December 2013
 10th Combat Aviation Brigade (TF Knighthawk)
 Headquarters and Headquarters Company, 2nd Assault Battalion, 10th Aviation Regiment
 Company C, 2nd Assault Battalion, 10th Aviation Regiment (UH-60M)
 Company E, 2nd Assault Battalion, 10th Aviation Regiment (Aviation Support)
 Company A, 2nd Assault Battalion, 10th Aviation Regiment (AH-64)
 Company B, 3rd General Support Aviation Battalion, 10th Aviation Regiment (CH-47F)
 Company C, 3rd General Support Aviation Battalion, 10th Aviation Regiment (HH-60M) 
December 2013–August 2014
Taskforce Wings
4-101 Aviation Regiment
Taskforce Lift
Company C (DUSTOFF), 7-101 General Support Aviation Battalion, 159th Combat Aviation Brigade, 101 Airborne Division
6-101 Aviation Battalion, 159th Combat Aviation Brigade, 101 Airborne Division 
 2014
 82nd Combat Aviation Brigade (TF Pegasus)
 Company E, 1st Attack Reconnaissance Battalion, 82nd Aviation Regiment (UH-60)
 Company F, 2nd Attack Helicopter Battalion, 82nd Aviation Regiment
 Company B, 3rd General Support Helicopter Battalion, 82nd Aviation Regiment using the Boeing CH-47F Chinook
 Company B, 122nd Aviation Support Battalion 
 October 2014
  Company B, 1st General Support Aviation Battalion, 169th Aviation Regiment (CH-47)
 May 2016 – Unknown
 40th Combat Aviation Brigade
 Company C, 1st Battalion, 104th Aviation Regiment (DUSTOFF)
 Company F, 2nd Battalion, 238th Aviation Regiment (UH-60)
 Company B, 1st Battalion, 140th Aviation Regiment
 1st Battalion, 10th Aviation Regiment (AH-64)
 2018
101st Combat Aviation Brigade (TF Eagle Assault)
 5th Battalion, 101st Aviation Regiment (CH-47, UH-60, AH-64E)
Company B, 3rd General Support Battalion, 25th Aviation Regiment (CH47F)
 2019
 1st Armored Division, Combat Aviation Brigade (TF Apocalypse)
 3rd Battalion (UH-60)
 16th Combat Aviation Brigade, B Company (CH-47) "Sugarbears"
 1st Combat Aviation Brigade, 1-1 Attack Battalion, Bravo Company (AH-64E) "Wolf Pack" "LUOFY"
 2-10 Combat Aviation Brigade, 10th Mountain Division 

Ground forces
 A, B and C Companies, 710th Brigade Support Battalion, 3rd Brigade Combat Team, 10th Mountain Division between December 2008 and 2009 and December 2009.
 Alpha Battery, 4th Battalion, 319th Airborne Field Artillery Regiment, 173rd Airborne Brigade Combat Team during July 2012.
 M777 howitzer
 M119 howitzer
 A Co, 1st Battalion – 41st Infantry Regiment, 3rd Infantry Brigade Combat Team, 1st Armored Division during 2011–2012.
 3rd Infantry Brigade Combat Team, 1st Armored Division from Fort Bliss, Tx, from 2011–2012. 
 628th Forward Surgical Team, from San Antonio, Tx, 2011–2012
 Elements of 427th BSB (NY ARNG) attached to 401st AFSB during 2011–2012
 1st Squadron (Airborne) 91st Cavalry, 173rd Airborne Brigade Combat Team, June 2012–March 2013.
 6th Squadron, 8th Cavalry Regiment, 4th Infantry Brigade Combat Team, 3rd Infantry Division, March 2013–November 2013.
 Bravo Company “Mongoose Bravo” 1st Battalion, 5th Cavalry Regiment, 2nd Brigade Combat Team, August 2013–March 2014 
 710th Brigade Support Battalion and 2nd Battalion, 87th Infantry Regiment, 3rd Brigade Combat Team, 10th Mountain Division between October 2013 and July 2014
 388th Clearance Company, January 2014–October 2014.
 B CO, 1st Battalion – 502nd Infantry Regiment, 2nd Brigade Combat Team, 101st Airborne (Air Assault) Division during January 2014–October 2014.
 2nd Squadron 3rd Cavalry Regiment between June 2014 to October 2014.
 1982nd Forward Surgical Team during 2015.
 Alpha Battery 1st Battalion 265th ADA Regiment; 164th ADA Brigade Florida Army National Guard, June 2015–February 2016 ADA
 207th Engineer Construction Company, Over The Horizon, 2017
 136th Combat Sustainment Support Battalion during October 2017.
 2-174 ADA C-RAM (Ohio National Guard) 2017–2018
 659th Engineer Construction Company, Over The Horizon, 2017–2018
 2nd Squadron 1st Cavalry Regiment, Fort Carson 2018–2019
 Elements of 495th Combat Sustainment Support Battalion 2018–2019.
 3rd Platoon, Alpha Company, 1-38 Infantry Battalion, 1st SBCT, 4th ID. 2018–2019
 Elements of the 329th Combat Sustainment Support Battalion, TF Viking 2019–2020
 801st Engineering Company, Over The Horizon, 2019
 829 Engineering Company, TF Over The Horizon, 2020
 Bravo and Delta Co and Headquarters Elements of the 1st Battalion 178 Infantry Regiment (Illinois National Guard) TF Southeast, September 2019–January 2020.
 Elements of Bravo Company and HHC 1st Battalion 508th Parachute Infantry Regiment, 3BCT, 82ND ABN DIV (TF FURY), October 2019–January 2020
 10th Mountain 1-32 Infantry

See also

 List of ISAF installations in Afghanistan

References

External links

"Rocket City," Afghanistan: Army thinks outside the box to protect troops at front-line base
Just Another Day in Rocket City
US soldiers increase base defense measures on FOB Shank
Truck bomb injures U.S. soldiers at Afghan base
In Opinion: Addicted to war—learning to deal with the highs and lows

Military installations of Afghanistan
Military installations of the Czech Republic
Military installations of the United States in Afghanistan
Fire support bases